Wadicosa is a genus of wolf spiders containing eleven species.

Species
 Wadicosa benadira (Caporiacco, 1940) — Somalia, Kenya
 Wadicosa cognata Kronestedt, 2015 — Kenya
 Wadicosa commoventa Zyuzin, 1985 — Turkmenistan
 Wadicosa daliensis Yin, Peng & Zhang, 1997 — China
 Wadicosa fidelis (O. P.-Cambridge, 1872) — Palearctic, Canary Islands
 Wadicosa jocquei Kronestedt, 2015 — Seychelles, Comoro Is., Madagascar, Mauritius
 Wadicosa okinawensis (Tanaka, 1985) — Ryukyu Islands
 Wadicosa oncka (Lawrence, 1927) — Africa
 Wadicosa prasantae Ahmed et al., 2014 — India
 Wadicosa quadrifera (Gravely, 1924) — India, Sri Lanka
 Wadicosa russellsmithi Kronestedt, 2015 — Mauritius

References

External links
Cytogenetic Studies on Siberian Spiders

Lycosidae
Araneomorphae genera
Spiders of Africa
Spiders of Asia